Trhové Sviny is a town in České Budějovice District in the South Bohemian Region of the Czech Republic. It has about 5,200 inhabitants. The historic town centre is well preserved and is protected by law as an urban monument zone.

Administrative parts

Villages of Březí, Bukvice, Čeřejov, Hrádek, Jedovary, Něchov, Nežetice, Otěvěk, Pěčín, Rankov, Todně, Třebíčko and Veselka are administrative parts of Trhové Sviny.

Geography
It lies mostly in the Gratzen Foothills, the eastern part lies in the Třeboň Basin. The municipal territory is rich on ponds, typical for this region.

History
The first written mention of Sviny is from 1260. It was founded around 1250 as a settlement with a castle on an old trade route, originally possibly called Svinice. In 1481, Sviny gained the privilege of organizing markets by King Vladislaus II. Since then, the town is called Trhové Sviny (from trh, the Czech word for "market").

Demographics

Sights

The Church of the Holy Trinity is the most impressive landmark of Trhové Sviny, located outside the urban area. It was built in the Baroque style in 1708–1710 and replaced a pilgrimage chapel, which stood here already in the 16th century. Next to the church there is a small spa building with healing spring.

The Church of the Assumption of the Virgin Mary is a late Gothic church originally from the end of the 13th century, rebuilt in the late 15th century.

The town hall on Žižkovo Square from 1845 replaced an old building from the 16th century. It stands in the middle of a row of valuable houses with compactly preserved arcades along the entire south side of the square. Gothic cellar and edging of a painted emblem in the building's gable are preserved from the older building. Other sights on the square are Baroque column with the statue of John of Nepomuk from 1722, and a hexagonal stone fountain from 1864.

Notable people
Emil Hácha (1872–1945), President of Czechoslovakia in 1938–1939

References

External links

Populated places in České Budějovice District
Cities and towns in the Czech Republic